Candice Prévost (born 24 June 1983 in Évreux) is a former French football player who last played for Paris Saint-Germain of the Division 1 Féminine. She played as an attacking midfielder. Prévost was a member of the France women's national football team making her debut in 2008.

In 2012 she ended her career.

References

External links
 
 
 France player profile 
 PSG player profile 
 

1983 births
Living people
French women's footballers
France women's international footballers
Paris Saint-Germain Féminine players
Sportspeople from Évreux
Division 1 Féminine players
Women's association football midfielders
Footballers from Normandy
21st-century French women